Sophia Omotola Omidiji  (born June 18, 1997) is a Nigerian-American football player. She played for the Nigerian U-20 Women National team and is signed to Dutch Division I Club S.B.V. Excelsior after completing a switch from KAA Gent in Belgium in June 2017.

Early life
Sophia Omotola Omidiji was born on June 18, 1997, and raised in Las Vegas, Nevada, by a Nigerian father and an American mother. She has three younger brothers and began playing football at the age of six. Omidiji played high school football for Sierra Vista High School where she is the all-time leading goal scorer with 98 goals in four seasons including scoring 38 goals in her final season. She played at the school including the school's first ever regional/State/NIAA Southern Nevada final. She also played club soccer with Las Vegas Premier Sports Academy for coach Eyal Dahan.

Playing career

PSV / FC EINDHOVEN
In August 2015, Omidiji signed with PSV/FC Eindhoven women's team in the Netherlands  prior to going to camp with the Nigerian U20 women National team, .

KAA GENT

In 2016, Sophia Omidiji transferred to KAA Gent which is a team that plays in the Belgium division I and played in 20 games and scored 18 goals with 12 assists.

S.B.V. Excelsior

In June 2017 Sophia Omidiji made the transfer from KAA Gent to S.B.V Excelsior which is a new addition to the Dutch Eredivisie which is the division I in the Netherlands.

International

Omidiji received her first national team call up with Nigeria women's national under-20 football team for an African world cup U-20 qualification game against Democratic Republic of Congo in an away game in Kinshasa. She called the call up to the national team the "greatest honor of my life".

She trained with the team in Abuja before heading to Kinshasa for the game against Congo where Nigeria won 2–1.

She received a national team call up into the senior women's team the super falcons on April 2 for a friendly against France.

Personal

Omidiji has 3 younger brothers named Lateef Omidiji Jr who played for the 2016-2017 current Dutch champions of the Netherlands: Feyenoord O15's, Rasheed Omidiji who played for FC Den Bosch's O10's selection team, and Amir Omidiji who played for V.V Baronie's JY7's.

References

1997 births
Women's association football midfielders
Nigeria women's international footballers
Living people
FC Eindhoven players
Sportspeople from Lagos
Sportspeople from Ogun State
Sportspeople from Las Vegas
Expatriate women's footballers in the Netherlands
Nigerian expatriates in the Netherlands
Women's association football forwards
Yoruba sportspeople
Nigerian women's footballers
American women's soccer players
21st-century American women